Watashi Kono Mama de li no Kana (私このままでいいのかな; Am I Okay Like This?) is the eighteen major Japanese release and ninth Japanese studio album by South Korean singer BoA. It was released by Avex Trax on February 14, 2018, in three versions. Commercially, the album peaked at number 13 on the Oricon Album Chart and at number 11 on the Billboard Japan Hot Albums chart.

Release 
The album was released on February 14, 2018, in three versions: CD, two CD+DVD, and as a digital download. Watashi Kono Mama de li no Kana (私このままでいいのかな) is BoA's first studio album with a title in Japanese, which translates to "Am I okay like this" in English.

Singles 
The release of Watashi Kono Mama de li no Kana was preceded by several digital singles, including with "Fly" in December 2014, "Lookbook" one year later, "Make Me Complete" in January 2016 and "Jazzclub" in December 2017. 

"Jazzclub" was first heard at the "BoA The Live in Billboard Live" concert held in Osaka in May 2017. The song's music video—filmed in New York City—was uploaded to SMTown's YouTube channel on December 24, 2017, and was subsequently released for digital download via Japanese music sites on January 24, 2018. The track "Watashi Kono Mama de li no Kana" was released simultaneously with the release of the album on February 14.

Commercial performance 
The album debuted and peaked at number 13 on the Oricon Albums Chart for the week of February 18, 2018. In its second week, the album fell to number 50. It also debuted and peaked at number 11 on Billboard Japan's Hot Albums for the week of February 26, 2018, placing at number 10 on Top Albums with 6,574 copies sold, and at number 20 on Top Download Albums. In its second week, the album fell to number 48 with 1,124 additional copies sold.

Track listing

Charts

Weekly charts

Monthly charts

Release history

References 

BoA albums
2018 albums
Avex Trax albums